Dauphinois may refer to:

 Any thing or person related to or originating from the historic French region of the Dauphiné
 The Arpitan or Franco-Provençal language
 Gratin dauphinois, a potato dish from the Dauphiné
 Alumni of the Paris Dauphine University